"Aisumasen (I'm Sorry)" is a song written by John Lennon released on his 1973 album Mind Games. The song is included on the 1990 box set Lennon.

Lyrics and music
The song's lyrics have Lennon apologising to wife Yoko Ono. Aisumasen is a slightly corrupted version of the formal term ai sumimasen, which means "I'm sorry" in Japanese. The line "It's hard enough I know to feel your own pain" reprises a theme found in a line from Lennon's earlier song "I Found Out." After the lyrics run out, a guitar solo is played. Authors Ken Bielen and Ben Urish interpret this solo as a continuation of the plea for forgiveness. The solo ends abruptly, which Bielen and Urish suggest  symbolises the rejection of Lennon's plea. In fact, by the time "Aisumasen (I'm Sorry)" was released, Lennon and Ono had separated. Author John Blaney agrees that the song implies that Lennon will not get the forgiveness and comfort he needs from Ono, and further states that the song reveals just how much he needed her.

"Aisumasen (I'm Sorry)" has some similarities to the Beatles song "I Want You (She's So Heavy)," which was also written by Lennon and inspired by Ono. Bielen and Urish claim that "Aisumasen (I'm Sorry)" has a similar rhythm to "a slowed down, semi-acoustic version" of "I Want You (She's So Heavy)."  "I Want You (She's So Heavy)" also ends abruptly.

Lennon had been working on the melody to "Aisumasen (I'm Sorry)" since at least 1971. A demo of the song was recorded during sessions for Lennon's Imagine. Originally, the melody belonged to a song whose working title was "Call My Name.", dating from a demo recorded in December 1971. In "Call My Name," Lennon was offering to comfort someone, but in the final version of the song Lennon is the one asking for forgiveness. In "Call My Name," the melodic line that became "Aisumasen" was sung to the words "I'll ease your pain."

Reception
Music critic Johnny Rogan finds the song to be "occasionally powerful" and feels it "brings some depth" to the Mind Games album. Keith Spore of The Milwaukee Sentinel called the song "a lovely ballad" which serves as a reminder of Lennon's past brilliance. Bielen and Urish consider it to be one of Mind Games strongest songs, although they think it may have been even stronger had Lennon stuck to his original lyrical impulses of "Call My Name." PopMatters feels that the song starts out well, "like classic Lennon blues," but that Lennon "never finds the conviction to carry the song across the finish line."

Ultimate Classic Rock critic Stephen Lewis rated "Aisumasen (I'm Sorry)" as Lennon's 8th greatest solo love song, saying that Lennon's falsetto singing of the line "All that I know is just what you tell me / All that I know is just what you show me" is a highlight of the song.

Personnel
The musicians who performed on the original recording were as follows:

John Lennon – vocals, acoustic guitar
David Spinozza – guitar
Pete Kleinow  – pedal steel guitar
Ken Ascher – keyboards
Gordon Edwards – bass guitar
Jim Keltner – drums

References

John Lennon songs
Songs written by John Lennon
1973 songs
Song recordings produced by John Lennon
1970s ballads
Songs about Yoko Ono
Rock ballads
Plastic Ono Band songs